In:Demand was the name of an English and Scottish syndicated radio program hosted by Stu Tolan. It was produced from Bauer Radio headquarters in Manchester, airing 1900 to 2200 on Sunday to Thursday nights on Bauer Place stations in England and Scotland.

On 17 February 2014 In:Demand England and In:Demand Scotland merged to create a single In:Demand programme, respective presenters Alex James and Romeo were dropped, with new presenter Stu Tolan introduced.

In October 2014, as part of wider changes to schedules on the Bauer stations, In:Demand was rescheduled to run on Sunday to Thursday nights, replacing prior local/regional Sunday night content including Scotland's In:Demand Uncut; the prior Friday night In:Demand slot was used for a new upbeat music show, Friday Night Floor Fillers.

The feature was dropped by Bauer on Monday 17 August and replaced by regional syndicates.

References

External links 
 In:Demand

In:Demand